Pselaphothrips is a genus of thrips in the family Phlaeothripidae.

Species
 Pselaphothrips gigas
 Pselaphothrips pomeroyi

References

Phlaeothripidae
Thrips
Thrips genera